Julia Montgomery (born July 2, 1960) is an American film and television actress. She first gained public attention for her role as Samantha Vernon on the soap opera One Life to Live (1977–1980). She subsequently appeared in the slasher film Girls Nite Out (1982), followed by the role of Betty Childs in the comedy film Revenge of the Nerds (1984). Montgomery reprised her role of Betty in the film's second and third sequels (1992–1994).

Life and career
Montgomery was born July 2, 1960, in Kansas City, Missouri. Montgomery's first role was on the soap opera One Life to Live as Samantha Vernon from 1976 to 1981. Her well-known film role is in the hit comedy film Revenge of the Nerds (1984) as Betty Childs; she reprised the role in the TV films Revenge of the Nerds III: The Next Generation (1992) and Revenge of the Nerds IV: Nerds in Love (1994).  She also played Dr. Sally Arthur, M.D. in Earth Star Voyager (1988), and appeared in the comedy films Up the Creek (1984) and Stewardess School (1986), and the horror films Girls Nite Out (1982) and The Kindred (1987).

Montgomery appeared on multiple television shows, including Columbo, Magnum PI, Midnight Caller, Full House, Cheers and The Honourable Woman.

Filmography

Film

Television

References

External links
 

1960 births
Living people
Actresses from Kansas City, Missouri
American film actresses
American soap opera actresses
American television actresses
20th-century American actresses
21st-century American actresses